Lake Aroarotamahine, also known as Green Lake, is one of two small crater lakes on Mayor Island / Tuhua in the Bay of Plenty, New Zealand. Its outlet is a wetland leading to the smaller Lake Te Paritu or Black lake.

The lake has a green colour due to algae. According to Māori legend, the green is the blood of Pounamu (greenstone) which fought a battle with Tuhua (obsidian), and, defeated, fled to the South Island.

References

Aroarotamahine
Aroarotamahine